Yeniyıldız is a belde (town) in Ulukışla district of Niğde Province at . It is a high-altitude town situated in Toros Mountains. The population of the village is 1136.

References

Populated places in Niğde Province
Towns in Turkey
Ulukışla District